Angel of the Night is the second studio album by American R&B singer Angela Bofill. It was produced by GRP Records label heads Dave Grusin and Larry Rosen.

The album was digitally remastered and re-released on 2001 by Buddah Records.

Track listing
All tracks composed by Angela Bofill; except where noted.

Personnel
Angela Bofill - lead and backing vocals, piano
Dave Grusin - piano, electric piano, synthesizer
Eric Gale - guitar
Ray Chew - piano, electric piano; horn and string arrangement on "People Make the World Go Round"
Ed Walsh - Oberheim - polyphonic synthesizer
Buddy Williams, Paul Kimbarow - drums
Francisco Centeno, Eluriel Tinker Barfield - bass guitar
Ralph MacDonald - percussion
Sammy Figueroa, Carol Steele - percussion, congas
Eddie Daniels - tenor saxophone
David Nadien - strings concertmaster
Dave Tofani, David Taylor, Harold Vick, Henry Mitchell, Howard Johnson, Lew Soloff, Virgil Jones - horns
Barry Finclair, Charles McCracken, Emanuel Vardi, Harry Glickman, Herbert Sorkin, John Pintavalle, Jonathan Abramowitz, Joseph Rabushka, Lamar Alsop, Louis Gabowitz, Marvin Morgenstern, Max Ellen, Richard Sortomme - strings
Gwen Guthrie, Patti Austin, Connie Harvey, Ednah Holt, John Danny Madden, Vivian Cherry - backing vocals

Charting History

Weekly Charts

Year End Charts

Charting Singles

References

External links
 Angela Bofill - Angel Of The Night at Discogs

1979 albums
Angela Bofill albums
GRP Records albums
Albums produced by Dave Grusin